Thyrocopa kokeensis is a moth of the family Xyloryctidae. It was first described by Matthew J. Medeiros in 2009. The species is endemic to the Hawaiian island of Kauai.

The length of the forewings is 8–9 mm. Adults are on wing at least from July to October. The ground color of the forewings is mottled very light whitish gray or whitish brown and gray or brown. The discal area is clouded with several poorly defined blackish spots in the cell. There are rather dark, evenly spaced spots on the distal half of the costa and along the termen at the vein ending. The anal and sometimes costal margin of the wing are often darker than the discal area and the termen. The hindwings are light brown, darker near apex. The fringe is very light brown.

External links

Thyrocopa
Endemic moths of Hawaii
Moths described in 2009